Somerset is a city located in Bexar County, Texas, United States. It is located less than 20 miles south of Downtown San Antonio and is part of the  metropolitan area. The population was 1,756 at the 2020 census.

History

English speaking European settlers had already arrived in the area by the early 1800s. Somerset was named for an organized settlement that had been begun in 1848, in what is now Atascosa County, by a group of Baptist families from Somerset, Kentucky. The present site was named Somerset when the First Townsite Company was formed on the Artesian Belt Railroad right-of-way on May 25, 1909, by A. M. Pyron, Carl Kurz, and Jonas A. Kerr.

In 1913, while drilling for artesian water, Kurz discovered oil and an economic boom followed. The Somerset oilfield extended from Somerset to below Pleasanton and was the largest known shallow field in the world at that time. Two oil refineries in the field and a pipeline into San Antonio handled the high-gravity crude.

The town grew rapidly from fifty residents in 1925 to 700 in 1928; it was served by a state bank, a ten-room hotel, and several machine and blacksmith shops. A post office opened there in 1920. A nearby lignite coal mine also added to the booming economy of the area.

During the 1920s farmers turned from cotton to dryland fruit and vegetable farming. In 1931, the Somerset Fruit Growers Exchange building was dedicated, and between truck farming, oil, and coal, the town prospered until the mid-1930s, when diminishing oil returns and the Great Depression caused a decline. In 1931 the town reported twenty businesses; by 1958 there were only eight.

In 1920, the Somerset Independent School District was formed from at least five other school districts: Wildman, Senior, Bexar, Old Rock (Old Somerset area), and Oak Island. The Somerset Police Department was created in 1972 followed by the city being incorporated in 1973.  Somerset has a mayor-council form of city government.

Geography

Demographics

As of the 2020 United States census, there were 1,756 people, 475 households, and 353 families residing in the city.

As of the census of 2000, there were 1,550 people, 513 households, and 392 families residing in the city. The population density was 773.7 people per square mile (299.2/km). There were 547 housing units at an average density of 273.0/sq mi (105.6/km). The racial makeup of the city was 77.16% White, 0.26% African American, 1.55% Native American, 0.19% Pacific Islander, 16.00% from other races, and 4.84% from two or more races. Hispanic or Latino of any race were 70.45% of the population.

There were 513 households, out of which 42.5% had children under the age of 18 living with them, 54.2% were married couples living together, 15.6% had a female householder with no husband present, and 23.4% were non-families. 21.1% of all households were made up of individuals, and 11.5% had someone living alone who was 65 years of age or older. The average household size was 3.02 and the average family size was 3.51.

In the city, the population was spread out, with 32.5% under the age of 18, 9.2% from 18 to 24, 29.7% from 25 to 44, 16.7% from 45 to 64, and 11.9% who were 65 years of age or older. The median age was 31 years. For every 100 females, there were 98.5 males. For every 100 females age 18 and over, there were 93.9 males.

The median income for a household in the city was $30,268, and the median income for a family was $31,875. Males had a median income of $27,083 versus $20,357 for females. The per capita income for the city was $11,238. About 22.0% of families and 23.2% of the population were below the poverty line, including 28.6% of those under age 18 and 26.6% of those age 65 or over.

Education
Residents are zoned to schools in the Somerset Independent School District.

References

External links

Cities in Bexar County, Texas
Cities in Texas
Populated places established in 1909
Greater San Antonio
1909 establishments in Texas